Nikos Halikopoulos (born May 15), known as Nik Halik, is a Greek-Australian financial entrepreneur and Russian trained civilian cosmonaut and co-author of the book 5 Day Weekend. He is a permanent resident of the United States.

Early life
Halik did not attend school until he was 10 years old.

Halik was raised in Melbourne, Australia and is of Greek descent. He is the youngest son of Greek immigrants.

Business interests

Halik is the founder and C.E.O. of companies such as Financial Freedom Institute, Lifestyle Revolution and 5 Day Weekend. He co-founded Poptik and Poptik Authentic, a high-tech patented Sub Optic print technology used in world currencies, anti-counterfeit and cannabis consumer brands. Having founded the Thrillionaire movement, he is a 5 Day Weekend lifestyle strategist, entrepreneur, keynote speaker, Russian certified civilian cosmonaut, and Wall Street Journal best-selling author. He became a multi-millionaire and amassed wealth through investments in multi-family apartment buildings, businesses and the financial markets. Apart from his other businesses, Nik Halik is also a stakeholder in a number of enterprises around the world, including Vertex Media, a Hollywood Television and Film production company. He is currently an active Angel investor and strategic adviser to several tech start-ups in the U.S. Halik has private homes in the Greek Islands, Morocco, the United States and Australia.

Adventures

Halik has travelled to 155 countries and participated in a civilian edge-of-space flight in a modified Soviet-built Mig25 jet.

Cosmonaut training
Halik studied at the Yuri Gagarin Cosmonaut Training Academy in Moscow, Russia. He was the back-up cosmonaut for the Russian Soyuz TMA-13 flight to the International Space Station in 2008, though ultimately didn't fly.

Books
The Thrillionaire (2008) 
5 Day Weekend (2018)

Notes
Halik's spaceflight training is also covered in the book "Australia's Astronauts: Countdown to a Spaceflight Dream," 2009, by Colin Burgess.

References

External links

 Nik Halik's official website
 5 Day Weekend website
 5 Day Weekend Book
 7 Questions with a Thrillionaire - Kaleidoscopic Wandering
 The Thrillionaire - WideWorldMag.com
 Space Adventures Announces the Identity of Back-up Crew Member - SpaceRef.com
 4 ways to crush your debt - Valuewalk.com

1969 births
Living people
Businesspeople from Melbourne
Australian motivational speakers
Australian people of Greek descent
Australian emigrants to the United States